Jürgen Simon (10 January 1938 – 26 October 2003) was a German cyclist. He won the silver medal in the Men's Tandem Sprint, 2000 metres at the 1960 Summer Olympics

References

1938 births
2003 deaths
Sportspeople from Gera
German male cyclists
German track cyclists
Cyclists from Thuringia
Olympic cyclists of the United Team of Germany
Cyclists at the 1960 Summer Olympics
Olympic silver medalists for the United Team of Germany
Olympic medalists in cycling
Medalists at the 1960 Summer Olympics
Recipients of the Patriotic Order of Merit in bronze
East German male cyclists
People from Bezirk Gera
20th-century German people